Clit is short for clitoris.

Clit mouse is a colloquial name for pointing sticks (computer input device).

Clit or Cliț can also refer to:
 Clit, a tributary of the river Saca (river) in Suceava County, Romania
 Clit, a village in Hășmaș Commune, Arad County, Romania
 Cliț, a village in Băbeni Commune, Sălaj County, Romania
 Clit, a village in Arbore Commune, Suceava County, Romania

See also
All pages beginning with "clit"